USS PC-1137 was a  built for the United States Navy during World War II. Shortly after the end of the war, she was renamed USS PCC-1137 when she was reclassified as a combat communications control ship. In 1956, she was renamed Worthington (PC-1137) but never saw active service under that name.

Career
PC-1137 was laid down on 29 December 1942 at the Defoe Shipbuilding Company in Bay City, Michigan; launched on 29 March 1943; towed down the Mississippi River to New Orleans for outfitting and acceptance trials; and commissioned there on 23 October 1943.

PC-1137 headed for the southwestern Pacific late in November, after shakedown training at the Submarine Chaser Training Center based at Pier 2 at PortMiami, Florida.  She transited the Panama Canal on 5 and 6 December, and arrived at Guadalcanal in the Solomon Islands on 18 February 1944.  Assigned to Task Group (TG) 35.6, the ship spent the next five months escorting convoys among various American bases in the southwestern Pacific and conducting anti-submarine patrols from bases throughout the Solomons chain.  On 26 July, she concluded that duty and began training to prepare for the invasion of the Western Carolines.  Those preparations lasted until 4 September, at which time she departed Guadalcanal in the screen for LST Flotilla 13, bound for the Palaus.

During the initial assault on Peleliu between 14 and 16 September, she served as forward control and reference ship for the landings on Orange Beach 3.  On the 16th, she completed that assignment and began screening the operational area against Japanese submarine attack.  She remained occupied in this task until 15 November when she received orders assigning her to TG 96.3 at Eniwetok Atoll and signaling a return to convoy escort duty.  Between 23 November 1944 and 3 March 1945, PC-1137 travelled the circuit between Eniwetok, Ulithi, Guam, and Saipan, screening supply and reinforcement convoys.

On 4 March, PC-1137 set a course for Pearl Harbor.  She arrived at Oahu on 13 March and began a seven-week repair period during which she was converted to a combat communications control ship.  She completed repairs and conversion near the end of the first week in May and then spent the following week in amphibious training exercises at Maui.  On 21 May, PC-1137 put to sea with LST Flotilla 35 en route to the Mariana Islands.  She arrived at Saipan on 10 June and reported for duty as a convoy escort.  For the remainder of the war, she made the convoy run between the Marianas and Okinawa in support of the final campaign of World War II and conducted anti-submarine patrols out of Apra Harbor, Guam.  On 20 August, five days after the cessation of hostilities, she was officially reclassified a combat communications control ship, PCC-1137.  After a repair period in late August and early September, the ship departed Guam on 20 September, bound for Japan and duty in the occupation forces there.

She arrived in Tokyo Bay on 25 September and joined TG 53.4.  The submarine chaser operated in Japanese waters with the occupation forces until the beginning of 1946.  After several months service in the Central Pacific, notably at Truk, Eniwetok, and Guam, she departed Eniwetok to return to the United States.

The ship made a six-day stopover at Pearl Harbor and then continued on to the west coast, arriving in Astoria, Oregon, on 27 May.  She began the inactivation process immediately and was decommissioned on 10 August.  Berthed with the Columbia River Group, Pacific Reserve Fleet, PCC-1137 lay idle during the remaining 12 years and six months of her Navy career.  On 15 February 1956, she received the name Worthington, one she wore for only three years.  On 29 May 1959, her name was struck from the Navy list; and later, she was sold for scrapping.

Worthington earned one battle star during World War II as PC-1137. Hollywood actor Kirk Douglas served as a gunnery and communications officer on the ship.

References

External links
 Photo gallery at navsource.org

 

PC-461-class submarine chasers
Ships built in Bay City, Michigan
1943 ships
World War II patrol vessels of the United States